Shahir 'Shaz' Chundra (born 27 May 1980), is a South African actor and filmmaker of Indian descent. He is best known for the roles in the television serials Stellenbosch, Professionals and The World Unseen.

Personal life
He was born on 27 May 1980 in Pietermaritzburg, KwaZulu-Natal, South Africa to an Indian family.

Career
He started acting at the age of 5 as a child actor. At the age 17, he started a degree in filmmaking at AFDA, The School for the Creative Economy in Johannesburg. After graduation, he directed popular South African SABC youth culture shows including; Street Journal and Kasi 101 and Noted. During this period, he worked as a writer of South African sitcoms: My Perfect Family and Majakhatata Records. In 2011 he moved to USA and studied acting at the New York Film Academy.

He became the content director on Survivor South Africa Champions and Masterchef Season 3. Then he became the Head of Content on Power Couple South Africa. As a Series Director, he made several notable programs such as Reality Check and Bootcamp Msanzi Celebrity Edition and Zavion Season 1. He is also a musician who worked as the lead singer of the rock band, 'MadLove', where he participated in 3 online number 1 singles.

In 2005, he appeared in the television serial Isidingo where he played the role Officer Brown in two episodes. The show became highly popular and continued until 2012. He also made the acting appearance in the serials: 7de Laan and Entabeni. In 2014, he starred in the Emmy award-winning international series Homeland season 4, where he played the role 'Infantry Major' in the episode "Krieg Nicht Lieb". In 2017, he played the lead villain, 'Raj Pillay' in the serial Bedford Wives aired on SABC 3. In the same year, he acted in the film An Act Of Defiance.

In 2018, he appeared in the South African Indian action crime film Mayfair. He played the supportive role of 'Parvez' in the film, which later received positive reviews. The film was also screened at the 62nd BFI London Film Festival and Africa in Motion Film Festival in October 2018.

In 2019, he acted in the 3 Days to Go and played the supporting role 'Roy'. The film had its theatrical release on 25 January 2019. In 2019, he became the Series Director on television series The Bachelor.

Filmography

References

External links
 

Living people
South African people of Indian descent
South African male film actors
South African male television actors
People from Durban
South African television directors
1980 births